Ji Seung-Hyun (born December 19, 1981) is a South Korean actor.

Filmography

Film

Television series

Web shows

Awards and nominations

References

External links

1981 births
Living people
South Korean male television actors
South Korean male film actors
Kyung Hee University alumni
People from Daegu